Ceycén Island (Isla Ceycén, sometimes spelled as Ceicén) is a coral island located in the Archipelago of San Bernardo, Gulf of Morrosquillo, Caribbean Sea. It is governed by Colombia, and is a part of the Colombian Bolívar Department.

Ceycén Island has a lighthouse that is 24 m (79 ft) in height.

See also
 Caribbean region of Colombia
 Insular region of Colombia
 List of islands of South America

References

External links
 Ceycén Island opinions (includes images). Datuopinion.com.
 Map of Ceycén Island on Mapcarta

Caribbean islands of Colombia